Justin Thomas Caldwell Vaughan (born 30 August 1967) is a former New Zealand cricketer who played six Test matches and 18 One Day Internationals between 1992 and 1997. He is a doctor of medicine by profession.

Life and career
Vaughan was an all-rounder: a left-handed middle-order batsman and right-arm medium-pace bowler. He played first-class cricket for Auckland in New Zealand domestic cricket from 1990 to 1997. He also had a season in England with Gloucestershire in 1992.

Vaughan's highest first-class score was 127 when Auckland defeated Canterbury in January 1996. His best bowling figures were 8 for 27 when Auckland beat Otago by three wickets in March 1997. He captained Auckland in both these matches, and led the team for the four seasons from 1993–94 to 1996–97. He was a very effective and economical bowler in limited-overs cricket, with best figures of 6 for 26 against Otago in December 1995.

In April 2007 he was appointed to the position of Chief Executive of New Zealand Cricket (NZC) and commenced in that position on 5 June 2007, taking over from Martin Snedden. He announced that he would step down from the position as of November 2011, citing family reasons for the decision. He has three children, Natalie, Jemima, and Bruno.

Vaughan was Chief Executive of BrainZ Instruments, an Auckland-based medical technology company listed on the ASX specialising in the development of innovative brain monitoring technology. In 2013, he moved to Sydney to take an executive role with leading Australian health insurer, NIB. He finished this role in 2020, and commenced as CEO of emerging health technology company BioEye in 2021.

References

1967 births
Living people
Auckland cricketers
Gloucestershire cricketers
New Zealand One Day International cricketers
New Zealand Test cricketers
New Zealand cricketers
New Zealand cricket administrators
Sportspeople from Hereford
New Zealand medical doctors
English emigrants to New Zealand
New Zealand chief executives